Ian Stewart Hudghton (born 19 September 1951) is a Scottish National Party (SNP) politician who was President of the SNP from 2005 to 2020.  He was a Member of the European Parliament (MEP) for North East Scotland (1998–1999) and its successor constituency; Scotland from 1999 to 2019.

Political career
Hudghton joined the SNP in 1967. He was a District and Regional Councillor and the first elected leader of the unitary Angus Council after its foundation in 1995/6. He had some success as an election agent for John Swinney and Allan Macartney.

He was first elected as a Member of the European Parliament in 1998, when he won his seat in a rare European Parliamentary by-election, after the death of sitting SNP MEP Allan Macartney.

Following the 2004 European elections, Hudgton became a member and Vice-President of the European Free Alliance Group in the Parliament, which retained its own identity within the joint Green-European Free Alliance Group.

He was a member of the Fisheries, Internal Market and Consumer Protection, and Transport and Tourism committees.

In September 2005 Hudghton was elected as President of the SNP, following the retirement of Winnie Ewing. He received a Lifetime Achievement Award at the inaugural SNP Annual Awards in November 2018.

He stood down as an MEP at the 2019 elections.

See also
Alyn Smith (SNP) MEP

References

External links
Personal MEP website  
European Parliament historical profile

1951 births
Living people
Presidents of the Scottish National Party
People from Forfar
Scottish National Party MEPs
MEPs for Scotland 1994–1999
MEPs for Scotland 1999–2004
MEPs for Scotland 2004–2009
MEPs for Scotland 2009–2014
MEPs for Scotland 2014–2019